Coggeshall United Football Club is a football club based in Coggeshall, Essex. They were founded in 2017 by former footballer Cliff Akurang, and are the second largest club in Coggeshall after Coggeshall Town.

History
The club was founded in 2017 and joined the Premier Division of the Essex & Suffolk Border League, with Cliff Akurang being appointed player-manager. Akurang also became club chairman later in the season. They finished second in the league in their first season, and successfully applied to join the new Division One South of the Eastern Counties League. In 2018, Andrew Douglas took over as Club President. Coggeshall United also signed their first media deal with Modus Operandi Sports, with Gareth Davies then appointed head of media. In the 2018–19 season, they finished 2nd in Division One South of the Eastern Counties League, narrowly missing out on promotion to Hashtag United.

Records
Highest league position: 2nd in Eastern Counties League Division One South 2018–19

Ground 
Coggeshall United play at Coggeshall Town's West Street ground, which is located to the west of Coggeshall.

References

Coggeshall United Website

External links
Official website

Football clubs in England
Football clubs in Essex
Association football clubs established in 2017
2017 establishments in England
Essex and Suffolk Border Football League
Eastern Counties Football League
Coggeshall